Paravathur is a village in the Orathanadu taluk of Thanjavur district, Tamil Nadu, India.

Demographics 

As per the 2001 census, Paravathur had a total population of 599 with 290 males and 309 females. The literacy rate was 70.81.

References 

 

Villages in Thanjavur district